The 2013 Lake Grassmere earthquake was a magnitude 6.6 earthquake that occurred at 2:31:05  pm (NZST) on Friday 16 August 2013. The epicentre was located about 10 km south-east of Seddon, under Lake Grassmere, with a focal depth of 8 km. The earthquake caused significant land damage in the local area, with landslips blocking roads, including the main highway between Blenheim and Christchurch.  Buildings in Seddon were damaged, with some being declared uninhabitable.  The earthquake was widely felt in both the North and South Islands of New Zealand.

Earthquake

This earthquake is considered to be a doublet of a magnitude 6.5 earthquake that occurred in Cook Strait on 21 July 2013 and is thought to have occurred on part of the same complex of faults. It started its own aftershock sequence, with several magnitude 5 and one magnitude 6 earthquakes occurring in the first few hours after the main shock.

Aftershocks

The earthquake generated a significant series of aftershocks, the largest of which had a magnitude of 6.0.

Below is a list of all aftershocks magnitudes 5.0 and above that occurred in the region between 16 August 2013 and 5 September 2013.

Damage

In Wellington, the earthquake caused minor damage to buildings, breaking some display windows and cracking plaster. Many central city office workers left work early, and with all suburban train services cancelled for urgent track inspections, bus services overloaded and traffic gridlock occurred on major roads out of the city for a couple of hours. The City Council ordered the deconstruction of a 30-year-old lift shaft that had been damaged in a previous earthquake in July, after recently installed emergency seismic restraints failed. Several surrounding buildings in the fall zone were ordered to be evacuated.

Seddon
The quake caused substantial damage to a number of residential homes in the Seddon area. Eight houses were evacuated by The Marlborough District Council and another 11 allowed only restricted access.

Rest of NZ
The quake was felt as far north as Auckland and far south as Dunedin. Damage was reported in the Kapiti Coast, Hutt Valley, Wellington, Blenheim, Ward and the rest of West Upper South Island.

See also
1848 Marlborough earthquake
2013 Seddon earthquake
2016 Kaikoura earthquake
List of earthquakes in 2013
List of earthquakes in New Zealand
Marlborough Fault System

References

External links

2013 earthquakes
2013 Lake Grassmere
Lake Grassmere earthquake
Doublet earthquakes
August 2013 events in New Zealand
2013 disasters in New Zealand